Rodolfo Rodino (born 31 July 1937) is a former Uruguayan cyclist. He competed in the individual road race and team pursuit events at the 1960 Summer Olympics.

References

External links
 

1937 births
Living people
Uruguayan male cyclists
Olympic cyclists of Uruguay
Cyclists at the 1960 Summer Olympics
Sportspeople from Montevideo
Pan American Games medalists in cycling
Pan American Games silver medalists for Uruguay
Competitors at the 1959 Pan American Games
Medalists at the 1959 Pan American Games